Colle Sannita is a  (municipality) in the Province of Benevento in the Italian region Campania, located about  northeast of Naples and about  north of Benevento.

Colle Sannita borders the following municipalities: Baselice, Castelpagano, Castelvetere in Val Fortore, Circello, Reino, Riccia, San Marco dei Cavoti.

References

External links
  Official website

Cities and towns in Campania